Island Creek Pond is a  pond in Duxbury, Massachusetts in the village of Tinkertown. The pond is located north of Mill Pond, south of North Hill Marsh Pond, and southwest of Pine Lake and Round Pond. The pond is the headwaters to Island Creek. The water quality is impaired due to non-native aquatic plants and non-native fish in the pond. Crocker Park, an open space area owned by the Town of Duxbury, is situated along the southern shore of the pond.

External links
Island Creek Pond, Mill Pond, Island Creek Information
Environmental Protection Agency
South Shore Coastal Watersheds - Lake Assessments

Ponds of Plymouth County, Massachusetts
Duxbury, Massachusetts
Ponds of Massachusetts